Shorea richetia is a species of plant in the family Dipterocarpaceae. It is endemic to Borneo, where it has been recorded in protected areas, including Kubah National Park in Sarawak.

References

richetia
Endemic flora of Borneo
Trees of Borneo
Taxonomy articles created by Polbot